Dehuj (also Romanized as Dehūj; also known as Deh Hūj) is a village in Ravar Rural District, in the Central District of Ravar County, Kerman Province, Iran. At the 2006 census, its population was 238, in 67 families.

References 

Populated places in Ravar County